Nicklas Kulti defeated Christian Bergström 3–6, 7–5, 6–4 to secure the title.

Seeds

  Richard Krajicek (second round)
  Sergi Bruguera (first round)
  Alexander Volkov (quarterfinals)
  Cédric Pioline (quarterfinals)
  Magnus Larsson (first round)
  Mark Woodforde (first round)
  David Wheaton (first round)
  Magnus Gustafsson (first round)

Draw

Finals

Section 1

Section 2

References

External links
 1993 Adelaide International draw

Singles